Lyndon is a given name and surname.

Notable people with this given name
Lyndon Amick (born 1977), American racing driver
Lyndon Andrews (born 1976), Trinidad and Tobago footballer
Lyndon Antoine (born 1986), Grenadian footballer
Lyndon Bateman (born 1979), Welsh rugby union player
Lyndon Byers (born 1964), Canadian ice hockey player
Lyndon Brook (1926–2004), British actor
Lyndon Carlson (born 1940), American politician
Lyndon Dunshea (born 1991), New Zealand rugby union player
Lyndon Dykes (born 1995), Australian footballer
Lyndon Emsley (born 1964), British chemist
Lyndon Lyn Evans (born 1945), Welsh physicist
Lyndon Evelyn (1759–1839), British Member of Parliament
Lyndon Farnham, Jersey businessman and politician
Lyndon Ferns (born 1983), South African swimmer
Lyndon Hannibal (born 1965), Sri Lankan cricketer
Lyndon Hardy, American physicist and author
Lyndon Hartnick (born 1986), South African rugby union player
Lyndon Hooper (born 1966), Canadian soccer player and coach
Lyndon Jackson, Micronesian politician
Lyndon James (born 1998), English cricketer
Lyndon B. Johnson (1908–1973), thirty-sixth President of the United States
Lyndon Johnson (American football) (born 1994), American football player
Lyndon Jones (born 1976), Welsh cricketer
Lyndon LaRouche (1922–2019), American economist, philosopher, and political activist 
Lyndon Lawless (born 1945), American musician and music educator
Lyndon Lea (born 1969), English financier and investor
Lyndon Loos (born 1996), Sri Lankan cricketer
Lyndon Andy McMillan (born 1968), South African footballer and coach
Lyndon Menegon (born 1948), Australian cricketer
Lyndon Henry Morris (1889–1946), British chief constable
Lyndon Mustoe (born 1969), Welsh rugby union player
Lyndon Needs, Welsh guitarist
Lyndon Ogbourne (born 1983), English actor
Lyndon Lowell Olson Jr. (born 1947), American politician and diplomat
Lyndon Pete Patterson (1934–2017), American politician 
Lyndon Rive (born 1977), South African-born American entrepreneur
Lyndon Rush (born 1980), Canadian bobsledder and coach
Lyndon Sims (1917–1999), Welsh rally driver
Lyndon Slewidge (born 1954), Canadian police officer and singer
Lyndon A. Smith (1854–1918), American educator, lawyer, and politician
Lyndon Smith (born 1989), American actress and singer
Lyndon Stromberg (born 1962), American sculptor and entrepreneur
Lyndon Terracini (born 1950), Australian operatic baritone
Lyndon Trott (born 1964), Guernsey politician
Lyndon Wainwright (1919–2018), English metrologist and ballroom dancer
Lyndon Watts (born 1976), Australian bassoonist 
Lyndon Woodside (1935–2005), American choral conductor
Lyndon Yearick (born 1964), American politician

Notable people with this surname
Donlyn Lyndon, American architect
Maynard Lyndon (1907-1999), American architect
Neil Lyndon (born 1946), British journalist and author
Roger Lyndon (1917–1988), American mathematician

Fictional characters 
Barry Lyndon, protagonist of the novel The Luck of Barry Lyndon and its film adaptation Barry Lyndon

See also 

Lyndon (disambiguation)